The Italian Armed Forces aircraft designation system is a unified designation system introduced by the Italian Armed Forces in 2009 for all Italian military aircraft. The system is based on the United States Armed Forces 1962 United States Tri-Service aircraft designation system.

Designation system
The designation system produces a Mission-Design-Series (MDS) designation of the form:
(Status Prefix)(Modified Mission)(Basic Mission)(Vehicle Type)-(Design Number)(Series Letter)
Of these components, only the Basic Mission, Design Number and Series Letter are mandatory. In the case of special vehicles a Vehicle Type symbol must also be included.

List of assigned aircraft designations

A - Attack
AV-8 - McDonnell Douglas AV-8B Harrier II
AV-8B
TAV-8B
A-11 - AMX International AMX
A-11A - AMX
TA-11A - AMX-T
A-11B - AMX ACOL
TA-11B - AMX-T ACOL
A-200 - Panavia Tornado
A-200A - Tornado IDS
TA-200A - Tornado IDS (trainer)
EA-200B - Tornado ECR
A-200C - Tornado post-MLU
TA-200C - Tornado post-MLU (trainer)

C - Transport
C-27 -  Alenia C-27J Spartan
C-27J
YEC-27J JEDI
C-42 - ATR 42
C-42C - ATR 42-500
C-50 - Dassault Falcon 50
VC-50A
C-130 - Lockheed Martin C-130J Super Hercules
C-130J
C-130J-30
C-180 - Piaggio P.180 Avanti
VC-180A - P180 Avanti
VC-180B - P180 Avanti II
C-222 - Aeritalia G.222
C-222A - G.222TCM1
C-222B - G.222TCM2
RC-222 - G.222RM
EC-222 - G.222VS
C-228 - Dornier 228
UC-228 - Dornier 228
C-319 - Airbus A319
VC-319A - A319CJ
C-900 - Dassault Falcon 900
VC-900A - Falcon 900EX
VC-900B - Falcon 900EASY

E - Electronics
E-550 - Gulfstream G550 CAEW
E-550A

F - Fighter
F-16 - Lockheed Martin F-16 Fighting Falcon
F-16A
F-16B
F-35 - Lockheed Martin F-35 Lightning II
F-35A - CTOL
F-35B - STOVL
F-2000 - Eurofighter Typhoon
F-2000A - Typhoon
TF-2000A - Typhoon (trainer)

G - Glider
G-2 - Schempp-Hirth Ventus 2
G-2B - Ventus 2B
G-4 - Schempp-Hirth Nimbus-4
G-4D - Nimbus-4D
G-4DM - Nimbus-4DM
G-17 - LAK-17
UG-17A - LAK-17
G-21 - Caproni Vizzola Calif
G-21S - A-21S Calif
G-103 - Grob G103 Twin Astir
G-103 - G 103 Twin Astir

H - Helicopter
H-3 - Sikorsky SH-3 Sea King
VH-3D - SH-3D
SH-3D - SH-3D ASW
UH-3D - SH-3D ASH
HH-3F - HH-3F Pelican
H-47 - Boeing CH-47 Chinook
CH-47C - CH-47C
CH-47F - CH-47F Chinook
H-90 - NHIndustries NH90
UH-90A - NH 90 TTF
SH-90A - NH 90 NFH
H-101 - AgustaWestland AW101
SH-101A - AW101 Maritime Patrol
EH-101A - AW101 AEW
UH-101A - AW101 Anti-Submarine Helicopter
HH-101A - AW101 CSAR 
H-109 - Agusta A109
CH-109A - A109A
CH-109B - A109A II
CH-109D - A109C
CH-109E - A109F
MRH-109A - A109T
MCH-109A - A109N
H-129 - Agusta A129 Mangusta
AH-129A - A129
AH-129C - A129C
AH-129D - A129D
H-139 - AgustaWestland AW139
HH-139A - AW139 Air Force SAR
PH-139A - AW139 Coast Guard SAR
UH-139A
VH-139A - AW139 Air Force VIP
HH-139B - AW139 Air Force SAR
PH-139B - AW139 Coast Guard SAR
UH-139B
UH-139C
H-169 - AgustaWestland AW169
UH-169A - AW169M
H-205 - Agusta-Bell AB 205
UH-205A - AB 205
H-206 - Agusta-Bell AB 206
RH-206A - AB 206A1
RH-206B - AB 206B1
RH-206C - AB 206C1
H-212 - Agusta-Bell AB 212
UH-212 - AB 212
HH-212A - AB 212 (AMI-SAR)
UH-212A - AB 212 (AWTI)
UH-212B - AB 212ASH
SH-212B - AB 212ASW
H-249 - Leonardo Helicopters AW249
AH-249A - AW249
H-412 - Agusta-Bell AB 412
HH-412A - AB 412
HH-412B - AB 412EP
HH-412C - AB 412HP
HH-412D - AB 412SP
H-500 - Breda Nardi NH-500E
TH-500B - NH-500E
OH-500A - NH-500 MC
OH-500B - NH 500 MD

KC - Tanker
KC-707 - Boeing 707T/T
KC-707A - 707T/T Tanker/Transport
KC-767 - Boeing KC-767
KC-767A

P - Patrol
P-42 - ATR 42
P-42A - ATR42MP-400
P-42B - ATR42MP-500
P-72 - ATR 72
P-72A - ATR72
P-1150 - Breguet Atlantic
P-1150A - Br.1150 Atlantic

Q - UAV
Q-1 - General Atomics MQ-1 Predator
RQ-1B - Predator A
MQ-1C - Predator A+
Q-7 - AAI RQ-7 Shadow
RQ-7C - Shadow 200
Q-9 - General Atomics MQ-9 Reaper
MQ-9A - Predator B
Q-10 - APR Strix C
RQ-10C - Strix C
RQ-10D - Strix D
Q-11 - AeroVironment RQ-11 Raven
RQ-11B - Raven B
RQ-11C - Raven DDL
Q-12 - APR Sixton
RQ-12A
Q-24 - APR Asio-B
RQ-24A
Q-25 - APR Spyball-B
RQ-25A
Q-26 - APR Crex-B
RQ-26A
Q-27 - Boeing Insitu ScanEagle
RQ-27A - ScanEagle
Q-28 - IA-3 Colibrì quadcopter
RQ-28A - IA-3 Colibrì

T - Trainer 
T-260 - SIAI-Marchetti SF.260
T-260A - SF.260AM
T-260B - SF.260EA
T-339 - Aermacchi MB-339
T-339A - MB-339A
FT-339B - MB-339CD1
FT-339C - MB-339CD2
AT-339A - MB-339PAN
T-345 - Aermacchi M-345
T-345A - M-345 HET
T-346 - Alenia Aermacchi M-346 Master
T-346A - M-346 Master
T-2006 - Tecnam P2006T
T-2006A- T2006A

U - Utility
U-166 - Piaggio P.166
U-166A - P.166M
U-166B - P.166DL3
U-166C - P.166DP1
U-208 - SIAI-Marchetti S.208
U-208A - S.208

See also
 United States Department of Defense aerospace vehicle designation
 United States military aircraft designation systems
 British military aircraft designation systems
 RLM aircraft designation system
 Soviet Union military aircraft designation systems
 Japanese military aircraft designation systems

References

External links
 Italian Ministry of Defence Categories page

Italian military aircraft
Italy